Plectrobrachis is a genus of flies in the family Pyrgotidae, containing a single species, Plectrobrachis filigena.

References 

Pyrgotidae
Diptera of Asia
Monotypic Brachycera genera
Taxa named by Günther Enderlein